Maxwell Wilber Becton (22 August 1868 Kinston, North Carolina –  2 January 1951 Rutherford, New Jersey) co-founded Becton Dickinson in 1897 with Fairleigh S. Dickinson.

Biography
Born in Kinston, North Carolina, Becton moved to Rutherford, New Jersey, where his company was based, and died there in his home in 1951.

Becton is interred at Hillside Cemetery in Lyndhurst, New Jersey.

References

1868 births
1951 deaths
BD (company) people
American businesspeople
People from Rutherford, New Jersey
Burials at Hillside Cemetery (Lyndhurst, New Jersey)